The University of Clermont-Ferrand was officially founded in 1896, by merging of two existing faculties (Literature and Sciences) and a medical school.

In 1976, due to political issues, the University split between University Clermont-Ferrand I - University of Auvergne and University Clermont-Ferrand II - Blaise Pascal University; they latter remerge in Clermont Auvergne University in 2017.

References

See also
 List of split up universities

Clermont-Ferrand
1896 establishments in France
Educational institutions established in 1896
1976 disestablishments in France
Educational institutions disestablished in 1976